Kommando can mean:
 Kommando, a German military term
 Boer Commando, Boer military units
 South African Commando System, South African military units
 Kommando 1944, an American short film depicting the internment of Japanese American citizens during World War II
 Comandău, a Romanian commune, called Kommandó in Hungarian
 Or see Commando (disambiguation)